Villa Taraschi  is a frazione  in the Province of Teramo in the Abruzzo region of Italy.

Frazioni of the Province of Teramo